Lou Jean (born 27 January 2004), known on stage as simply Lou, is a French singer.

Biography
Lou Jean was born on 27 January 2004 in Castres, Tarn. At the age of eight, she began taking singing and theatre classes. She shared her covers of songs on her YouTube channel.

After the final episode of the third French season of The Voice Kids, which was broadcast on TF1 in 2016, she began working on an album. Its first single, Toutes les chances du monde, was released in July 2017. She was also cast into the TF1 soap opera Demain nous appartient, which premiered around the same time, on 17 July 2017, and she sang its theme song.

The Voice Kids 
Lou's YouTube covers attracted the attention of the TV producers of The Voice Kids on TF1, who offered her a spot on season 3 of the show. She finished the season in 2nd, behind Manuela Diaz.

After The Voice Kids 
After The Voice Kids, Lou Jean produced her first album. It is headed by her first single, All the chances of the world, which backs the credits of the TF1 series Tomorrow Belongs to Us, in which she plays Betty Moreno.

In 2017, Lou participated in the Sardou et nous... project, with Kids United, Nemo Schiffman, Angie Robba, Dylan, Ilyana and Thibault. The same year, she also participated in the project Enfoirés Kids.

In 2018, she rereleased her album with 4 new titles: a cover of M'en aller in a duet with Evan and Marco, Une fille du soleil (Mi Eldorado) in a duet with Adryano, the English credits of Miraculous Ladybug with Lenni-Kim, and Maya Maya (Les jeux du miel), a song from the movie Maya the Bee, a film in which she lends her voice to the character Violette.

In 2019, Lou released her second album entitled Danser sur tes mots, available in normal and collector's edition. A third edition was released a few months later, featuring the bonus singles This wall that separates us with Lenni-Kim, Miraculous (credits to the Miraculous: Tales of Ladybug & Cat Noir) with Lenni-Kim, N'importe quoi, Les loups, and Près du cœr .

In 2020, Lou participated in the project Green Team alongside Carla Lazzari, Erza Muqoli, the new generation of Kids United, and many others. The same year, she reached one million subscribers on her YouTube channel.

In 2021, Lou released the single Ne me suis pas, a song written and composed by herself. She interprets the role of Capucine in season 8 of the series Léo Matteï , broadcast on TF1. On July 13, she released the song Y'a pas Moyen, taken from the episode Les perchés (in which she plays the role of Lola) of the series Josephine, Guardian Angel. She released a single on July 23, named So So. On September 24, she released her new album Papillons, which features originally composed music. She then released a clip of the title taken from her album Butterflies: Vital on October 12.

Discography

Albums

Singles

References 

French child singers
Living people
2004 births
French women singers